Colleen Plimpton (born 1949) is an American garden communicator specializing in ornamental horticulture, garden memoir, and historical gardening women.

Biography 
Plimpton grew up in the small upstate New York farming town of Lima. Her parents were factory worker Sylvalan (Fred) (1922-2012) and schoolteacher Dorothy (1922-2007). She graduated from Lima High School and received a B.A. in Anthropology from Fordham University and a Master’s in Social Work from Columbia University.  Plimpton worked as a clinical social worker for many years in numerous locales and has resided for the past 20 years in Bethel, Connecticut, where she teaches, lectures, coaches and writes about gardening.

Work 
Column(s):

 On Gardening, Hearst Connecticut Media Group (2009-)
 Down the Garden Path, Hearst Media Services (2012-)

Books: 

 Woodstock Revisited, Chapter 21, A Day in the Country  50 stories about the famous festival by individuals who were there.
 Mentors in the Garden of Life, A garden memoir chronicling how we learn lessons about both life and horticulture while digging in the dirt with those we love.
 →Finalist for the 2011 Connecticut Book of the Year (Memoir category)
 →Winner of the 2010 International Book Award in the Home (Garden category)
 →Finalist in the USA Book News “Best Books 2010” for the Home (Garden category)
 →3rd Place in the Connecticut Press Club 2010 Awards for Nonfiction (Inspirational category)

Plimpton's articles have appeared in numerous magazines, including Toastmaster, Connecticut Gardner, and Greenprints.

References

Living people
American garden writers
1949 births
Fordham University alumni
Columbia University School of Social Work alumni